Andy Frasco & The U.N. are an American blues rock band formed in Los Angeles, California, United States in 2007. The band consists of Andrew Frasco (lead vocals, keys), Ernie Chang (saxophone), Shawn Eckels (guitar, vocals) and a consistently rotating and evolving cast of additional band members to form the U.N.  Additional featured members of the U.N. include Daniel Avila (guitar), Andee "Beats" Avila (drums, vocals), Floyd Kellogg (bass guitar), Supa Man (bass guitar) from the band Philosophy of Soul, as well as members of the Kris Lager Band: Kris Lager (guitar, vocals), Jeremiah Weir (organ, keys), Brandon Miller (bass guitar), and John Fairchild (drums). Matt Owen (tuba) of Eclectic Tuba is the most recent member of the band. 

To date, the band has released eight studio albums: Love, You're Just Too Expensive (2010), Road Life Revival (2012), Just a Good Ole Time (2013), Half a Man (2014), Happy Bastards (2016), Change of Pace (2019), Keep On Keepin' On (2020), and Wash, Rinse, Repeat (2022). 

In 2017, the band released their first live album (CD and DVD) entitled Songs From the Road, which was recorded in August 2016 at the Tucher Blues and Jazz Festival in Bamberg, Germany. In September 2021, they released Live On the Rocks, an album recorded live at the Red Rocks Amphitheatre in Colorado on May 27, 2021.

Sound
Their sound has been described as "blues-rock fueled by reckless abandonment and a disregard for the rules, with witty lyrics to back it all up".

Performances

Andy Frasco & the U.N.’s performances have been described as a "boisterous blend of harmonic funk and jazzy influences, all topped with boundless energy". Frasco frequently calls additional guest musicians to join his band on stage during sets, as well as fans. Shows are highly improvisational featuring impromptu “battles” between band members, who graciously hop off stage into the crowd to contest their instrumental fortitude against one another in a sporting display of individual musicianship. Frasco's shows are also highly interactive, often stopping the show to speak directly to audience members, as well as invite people in the audience up on stage.

Andy Frasco & the U.N. are recognized for their heavy tour schedule and D.I.Y. work ethic. The band has toured the U.S. numerous times over, as well as Europe, and China, performing at festivals such as Wakarusa, Electric Forest Festival, Sacred Rose Festival, Yonder Mountain String Band's Harvest Festival, String Cheese Incident's Festival at Horning's Hideout, Cotai Jazz & Blues Festival, Zwarte Cross Festival, Paaspop, Koningsmiddag Festival, Geuzenpop Festival, and the Tucher Jazz & Blues Festival.

Wakarusa 2014
Andy Frasco & The U.N. co-headlined a handful of Pre-Wakarusa events with support from Mike Dillon's Band of Outsiders, performed two sets at the festival, and shared guest hosting duties, introducing many big-name acts such as The Flaming Lips.

Electric Forest 2014
The band was selected by Live for Live Music as the top performance pick. SoundFuse Magazine stated "This was easily one of the most energetic moments of the weekend", noting the crowds lively dancing and attempts to rush onto the stage.

Discography

Albums 

 Love, You're Just Too Expensive (2010)  2010 Lifeline Promotion
 Road Life Revival (2012) Fro it Out Music
 Just a Good Ole Time (2013) Fro it Out Music
 Half A Man (2014) Fun Machine Records
 Happy Bastards (2016) Ruf Records
 Songs From The Road (CD/DVD set, 2017) Ruf Records
 Change of Pace (February 22, 2019) Fun Machine Records
 Keep On Keepin' on (April 24, 2020) SideOneDummy Records
 Live On the Rocks (September 15, 2021), Fun Machine Records
 Wash, Rinse, Repeat (2022), Fun Machine Records

References

External links

 

American blues musical groups